Natural disasters in Indonesia can usefully be divided into major disasters, medium level disasters, and lesser disasters which although causing less damage are very common across Indonesia. These can conveniently be considered as macro, mezzo, and micro events.  Policies to respond to natural disasters in Indonesia, which are still in an early stage of being developed, need to develop strategies to deal with each of these different types of disasters.

The official website of the Indonesian National Disaster Mitigation Agency (Badan Nasional Penanggulangan Bencana) provides frequent updates on disasters occurring in Indonesia.

Major natural disasters with widespread loss of life

The following is a list of main natural disasters that have occurred in Indonesia during recent history which have led to major loss of life (broadly defined here as over 500 deaths in the disaster).

(1) Total death toll unknown. The eruption is believed to have had a worldwide impact.
(2) This is the estimated death toll from the direct impact of the eruption.  A total of perhaps 70,000 people are estimated to have died from starvation and disease in the area in the months following the eruption.  See also 1815 eruption of Mount Tambora.
(3) "Some thousands" are reported to have died.
(4) Source: MCEER, University of Buffalo, The State University of New York, Major Indonesian Earthquakes of the 20th Century, accessed 29 December 2013.
(5) This is the estimated death toll in Indonesia.  An estimated 60,000 more people died in other countries surrounding the Indian Ocean, especially in Sri Lanka.
(6) The original official death toll was around 2,200.  However several thousands more, perhaps 4,000 or more, were buried in a major mudslide during the earthquake. It has therefore been difficult to compile a reliable estimate of the final toll.  As of February 2019, it was estimated that over 4,300 died.

Medium level natural disasters

In addition to the disasters listed in the table above, there are a large number of natural disasters in Indonesia which cause medium levels of loss of life (here defined, roughly, as between 50 and 500 deaths) or which give rise to large numbers of internally displaced refugees, sometimes for some months or more.  Some recent examples of these include the following.

Note. Estimates of the numbers of evacuees can vary considerably in short periods of time. In some cases large numbers of people move away from a threatened area but return to their homes as soon as possible. It is often the case in Indonesia that people are reluctant to move away from their homes, or stay away long, because of worries about loss of property through theft and because of the need to look after local farms and cattle. Figures listed here are generally the peak numbers although sometimes different sources provide different estimates.

Lesser natural disasters

There is a large number of smaller natural disasters in Indonesia each year which often lead to deaths of 10 or 20 people or more.  For example, landslides (tanah longsor) are very common in upland areas, especially during the rainy season, and cause much local damage and deaths.

Flooding is also a regular problem across many parts of Indonesia. The capital city Jakarta is subject to severe floods from time to time which usually cause some loss of life and significant damage to public and commercial infrastructure. In January 2014, for example, over 20 people lost their lives during widespread flooding and at one stage over 60,000 citizens were temporarily housed in nearly 250 evaluation shelters across the city.

In many rural areas, local flooding is very common and brings loss of life as well as much local inconvenience to economic and community life. Recent examples of these sorts of problems at the regional level include:

 A landslide at a resort in Pacet near Mojokerto in East Java in 2002 when over 30 people died.
 A landslide in Agam Regency in West Sumatra in January 2013 which left 20 people dead.
 A series of landslides and floods in Manado in North Sulawesi in February 2013 which caused much damage and killed at least 17 people.
A landslide in West Bandung Regency in West Java in March 2013 in which 17 people were killed
 Flash floods and landslides in Manado in North Sulawesi in January 2014 in which at least 16 people died and 40,000 were evacuated. Around 1,000 homes were flooded; the government allocated Rp 3.3 billion (almost $300,000) for assistance.
A 6.4-magnitude earthquake in late July 2018 killed at least 16 people, and injured around over 350, in Lombok in Eastern Indonesia.
Floods in Greater Jakarta (Jabodetabek) on 1–3 January 2020 killed at least 48 people, and  more than 31,000 people were evacuated. Floods occur because of rain that occurred from 31 December 2019 to 1 January 2020.

National outlook

2014

According to the National Disaster Mitigation Agency (BNPB, or Badan Nasional Penanggulanan Bencana), as many as 566 people were killed by natural disasters and displaced over 2.6 million in Indonesia in 2014. Almost all of the disasters were classified as hydro-meteorological events. Tornadoes were the most common natural disaster (496 events) followed by floods (458 events) and landslides (413 events). Landslides caused the most deaths estimated at around 343 people.

See also
 Lists of disasters in Indonesia
 List of earthquakes in Indonesia
 Indonesian tsunami, list of
 List of wildfires in Indonesia

References

External links 
 Official website of the Indonesian National Disaster Mitigation Agency (Badan Nasional Penanggulangan Bencana).  This website provides useful statistics on disasters in Indonesia.
 The ReliefWeb Indonesian page provides information on disasters in Indonesia since the mid-1980s.
 The website of the Java Reconstruction Fund, which was established after the major earthquake in Yogyakarta in 2006, provides useful references about approaches to disaster relief in Indonesia.
 Disaster displacement: Indonesia country briefing, 2023

 Natural
Natural